Greater Noida Industrial Development Authority (GNIDA), simply sometimes Greater Noida Authority and at times shortened to GreNo Authority is a nodal agency and a planning authority which is solely responsible for the administration of Greater Noida in the Gautam Buddha Nagar district of Uttar Pradesh, India. It comes under the Uttar Pradesh government's Department of Infrastructure and Industrial Development.

Established in January 1991 by the Government of Uttar Pradesh during the First Mulayam Singh Yadav ministry under the UP Industrial Area Development Act, 1976, it is responsible for the city's overall planning, development, maintenance, regulation and operation and is among the nine industrial development authorities of Uttar Pradesh.

History 

References 

State industrial development corporations of India
1991 establishments in Uttar Pradesh
Government agencies established in 1991